William Calvin Maxwell (November 9, 1892 – August 12, 1920) was an American pilot in the United States Army Air Service and namesake of Maxwell Air Force Base in Montgomery, Alabama.

Born in Natchez, Alabama, Maxwell was one of seven children of John R. and Jennie Maxwell, and was raised in  Atmore. He enrolled as an Army ROTC student at the University of Alabama in Tuscaloosa, and left college in 1917 to enlist in the Army during World War I.

Maxwell received his commission in April 1918, after completing flight training at Kelly Field at San Antonio, Texas. In 1919, he was assigned to 3rd Aero Squadron, Philippines. On August 12, 1920, engine trouble forced Lt. Maxwell to attempt to land his DH-4 in a sugarcane field. Maneuvering to avoid a group of children playing below, he struck a flagpole stanchion hidden by the tall sugarcane and was killed instantly. He was buried back in Atmore at the Robinsonville Baptist Church Cemetery.

Honors 
On the recommendation of his former commanding officer, Major Roy C. Brown, Montgomery Air Intermediate Depot was renamed Maxwell Field on November 8, 1922.

References

External links

 

1892 births
1920 deaths
Aviators from Alabama
Aviators killed in aviation accidents or incidents
People from Atmore, Alabama
United States Air Force airmen
United States Army officers
Victims of aviation accidents or incidents in 1920